Eucalyptus cullenii, commonly known as Cullen's ironbark, is a species of small to medium-sized tree that is endemic to Queensland. It has thick, rough, deeply furrowed "ironbark", lance-shaped adult leaves, green to yellow flower buds in groups of seven, white flowers and hemispherical fruit.

Description
It has thick, rough, dark grey or black, deeply and widely furrowed ironbark on its trunk and branches. Flowering occurs from January to May and the flowers are white.

Taxonomy and naming
Eucalyptus cullenii was first formally described in 1920 by Richard Hind Cambage from a specimen collected at Almaden in 1913. The specific epithet (cullenii) honours William Portus Cullen, a barrister and later Chief Justice of New South Wales.

Distribution and habitat
Cullen's ironbark grows in red podsols and shallow stony soil in hilly or undulating woodland on the northern and eastern parts of the Cape York Peninsula.

Conservation status
This eucalypt is classified as "least concern" under the Queensland Government ''Nature Conservation Act 1992.

See also
List of Eucalyptus species

References

Trees of Australia
cullenii
Myrtales of Australia
Flora of Queensland
Plants described in 1920